The men's individual recurve archery competition at the 2018 Asian Games was held from 21 to 28 August at Gelora Bung Karno Archery Field.

A total of 79 archers participated in the ranking round. Only the top two archers from each country were allowed to progress to the knockout stage.

Schedule
All times are Western Indonesia Time (UTC+07:00)

Results

Ranking round

Knockout round

Bracket

Finals

Section 1

Section 2

Section 3

Section 4

1/32 eliminations

1/16 eliminations

1/8 eliminations

Quarterfinals

Semifinals

Bronze medal match

Gold medal match

References

External links
Official website

Men's individual recurve